Section 8 was a category of discharge from the United States military, used for a service member judged mentally unfit for service. Section 8 was also often given to cross-dressers, gay, lesbian, bisexual and transgender people.

History
The term comes from Section VIII of the World War II–era United States Army Regulation 615–360, concerning the separation of enlisted men from military service. Section VIII provided for the discharge of men who were deemed mentally unfit for military service.

The term "Section 8" eventually came to mean any service member given such a discharge, or behaving as if deserving such a discharge, as in the expression, "he's a Section 8".

Section 8 discharges were often given to gay men, lesbians, bisexuals, cross-dressers, and transgender people, as they were deemed mentally unfit to serve in the military. A Section 8 discharge often made it difficult for people to find work in civilian life and did not allow for veterans benefits.

Discharge under Section 8 is no longer practiced, as medical discharges for psychological or psychiatric reasons are now covered by a number of regulations. In the Army, such discharges are handled under the provisions of AR 635–200, Active Duty Enlisted Administrative Separations. Chapter 5, paragraph 13 governs the separation of personnel medically diagnosed with a personality disorder.

In culture
 Section 8 became a household phrase when used in the 1970s TV series M*A*S*H, in which the character Corporal Klinger was continually seeking one (until he eventually abandoned his efforts). His preferred method of doing so was cross-dressing, but other attempts included setting himself on fire and consuming a Jeep piece by piece.
 In Modern Warfare 2019, the character Sgt. Wayne Dylan Davis ("D-Day") is given a Section 8 discharge after the failed rescue attempt of a teammate
In the 2003 movie Basic, a DEA agent Tom Hardy (played by John Travolta) investigates a group of apparently insane mercenary Rangers turned drug dealers calling themselves Section 8.
 In Stanley Kubrick's 1987 film Full Metal Jacket the character of Pvt. Leonard "Gomer Pyle" Lawrence (played by Vincent D'Onofrio) is described as potentially being a Section 8 when it is noticed that he talks to his rifle, and another rifleman in the Lusthog Squad, aptly named Hand Job, was sent to a Navy psychologist due to excessive masturbation (as Cowboy put it, "jerking off 10 times a day") and was instantly classified as a Section 8 after he started masturbating in the waiting room.
 American deathcore band Whitechapel featured a song called "Section 8" on their self-titled album from 2012.
 In the war novel A Separate Peace the character Elwin "Leper" Lepellier gets a Section Eight discharge from the ski troops because he was hallucinating due to sleep deprivation.
 Cliffhanger film, 1993. Starring Sylvester Stallone, where a character named Travis goes crazy at the end says, "..I've gone full ..(expletive).. Section 8."

Notable examples
During World War II, in November 1943, at age 17, actor Sidney Poitier lied about his age and enlisted in the Army. He was assigned to a Veteran's Administration hospital in Northport, New York, and was trained to work with psychiatric patients. Poitier became upset with how the hospital treated its patients and feigned mental illness to obtain a discharge. Poitier confessed to a psychiatrist that he was faking his condition, but the doctor was sympathetic and granted his discharge under Section VIII of Army regulation 615–360 in December 1944.

See also 
 Blue discharge
 Section 8, a video game named after the military term due to its game mechanics of "dangerously insane" orbital flights.
Don't ask, don't tell

References 

United States military law
Military psychiatry
Disability in law
LGBT people and military service in the United States